The University of Sydney Nano Institute (Sydney Nano) is a flagship multidisciplinary research institute at the University of Sydney in Camperdown, Sydney, Australia. It focuses on transforming the economy, society, and everyday life through multidisciplinary research in nanoscale science and technology. It is one of ten multidisciplinary research institutes at the University of Sydney including the Charles Perkins Centre and the Brain and Mind Centre.

Location and facilities 
Sydney Nano is headquartered at the Sydney Nanoscience Hub. It was built for nanoscience research, and opened in 2015; located on the University's Camperdown/Darlington campus.

History 
Originally launched in April 2016, as the Australian Institute for Nanoscale Science and Technology (AINST). The Institute was later renamed The University of Sydney Nano Institute in November 2017.

In July 2017, the University of Sydney announced a multi-year partnership with Microsoft to conduct research into quantum computing and the official establishment of Microsoft Quantum – Sydney at the Sydney Nanoscience Hub.

In March 2018, the New South Wales Government provided a A$500,000 grant to set up the Sydney Quantum Academy to strengthen postgraduate research and training in Sydney in the race to build a quantum computer. The Academy will be led by the University of Sydney in partnership with Macquarie University, the University of New South Wales and the University of Technology, Sydney.

Directors 
Sydney Nano was jointly led by three interim directors — Thomas Maschmeyer, Simon Ringer, and Zdenka Kuncic — who oversaw the launch period of the Institute from March 2016.

Susan Pond was appointed to the directorship in February 2017, for a period of 12 months. Pond is a senior leader in business and academia and is recognised for her significant national and international contributions to medicine, science, and technology. Awards include: Member of the Order of Australia (1994), Doctor of Medicine honoris causa from the University of Queensland, and the Centenary Medal. In 2013, she was named as one of Australia's Top 100 Women of Influence by The Australian Financial Review and Westpac. Pond is a Fellow of the Royal Australasian College of Physicians, the Australian Academy of Technological Sciences and Engineering, the Australian Academy of Health and Medical Sciences and the Australian Institute of Company Directors.

Ben Eggleton served as director from May 2018 to December 2022, when Alice Motion was appointed interim Director for six months.

References 

Nano Institute
Nanotechnology institutions
2016 establishments in Australia